TV Showboat is an Australian television series which aired in 1960 on ABC. A variety show with emphasis on music, it was produced in Melbourne and was kinescoped for showing in Sydney (it is not known if it was also shown on ABC's stations in Adelaide and Brisbane). Performers included singers Jim Berinson and Anne Lane, and banjo player Hec McLennan.

Episodes were 30 minutes in duration, in black-and-white. The series aired live.

References

External links
TV Showboat at IMDb

1960 Australian television series debuts
1960 Australian television series endings
Black-and-white Australian television shows
Australian variety television shows
Australian Broadcasting Corporation original programming
English-language television shows
Australian live television series